Angela Eve Simmonds (born October 12, 1975) is a Canadian politician, who was elected to the Nova Scotia House of Assembly in the 2021 Nova Scotia general election. She represents the riding of Preston as a member of the Nova Scotia Liberal Party. Prior to Simmonds election, she was a lawyer, social justice advocate, and executive director of the Land Titles Initiative.

Simmonds announced on January 25, 2023 that she intends to step down as MLA for Preston on April 1 of that year.

Early life and education
Simmonds grew up in Cherry Brook, Nova Scotia and graduated from Dalhousie Law School in 2017.

Personal life
She lives in North Preston with her husband, Dean, who is a superintendent with the Halifax Regional Police, and they have three children.

Land titles initiative 
In 2014, Simmonds authored a document named: "This Land is Our Land: African Nova Scotian Voices from the Preston Area Speak Up". This document talked about how the African Nova Scotian communities in the Preston areas continue to face ongoing concerns regarding the expropriation of land, clarity of land titles and education regarding land ownership and inheritance. The challenges that Simmonds wrote about highlighted that the challenges in these communities stem from a history fraught with racism, oppression and inequity. In the document Simmonds referenced that today, fewer instances of overt racism occur and the problems are more systemic, however more work needs to be done.

Following the publication of: "This Land is Our Land: African Nova Scotian Voices from the Preston Area Speak Up", Simmonds continued her advocacy for land titles to be granted to those residing on unregistered land. Owing to her commitment on resolving the issue, Simmonds was named executive director of the Land Titles Initiative on March 5, 2021, by the Equity and Anti-Racism Initiatives. Due to Simmonds' election in August, 2021, she had to step aside from the role as she was now the MLA for Preston.

Political career
Simmonds was one of four Black Canadians elected to the Nova Scotia legislature in 2021. On September 24, 2021, Simmonds was elected Deputy Speaker of the House of Assembly, which makes Simmonds the first African Nova Scotian speaker in the province's history. Simmonds is a member of the Law Amendments Committee. She is also a member of the House of Assembly Management Commission.

Simmonds is the Justice Critic within the Nova Scotia Liberal Caucus

On October 29, 2021, the House of Assembly voted to condemn a Justice Ministry staff member who was later fired after making racist comments against Simmonds on social media.

2022 Liberal Leadership Contest 
On February 4, 2022, Simmonds launched her campaign for leader of the Nova Scotia Liberal Party following Iain Rankin's announcement that he would be stepping down. She was the first person to declare their candidacy for Leader of the Nova Scotia Liberal Party Simmonds' leadership campaign slogan was "New Energy for Nova Scotians". On July 9, 2022, she lost the leadership election to Zach Churchill.

Bills introduced

Electoral Record

Liberal Leadership 2022 results

References

Living people
Nova Scotia Liberal Party MLAs
Women MLAs in Nova Scotia
21st-century Canadian politicians
21st-century Canadian women politicians
Black Canadian politicians
Black Canadian women
1975 births